Shenley was a railway station on the Outer Circle railway line located in the suburb of Canterbury, Melbourne, Victoria, Australia. It was located immediately to the north of the Canterbury Road overbridge.

Opened on 24 March 1891, it had two side platforms on a loop, with the main platform located on the east side of the line. The station was closed with the rest of the Outer Circle on 12 April 1893, but was reopened on 14 May 1900, to serve passengers on the so-called Deepdene Dasher shuttle service. After reopening it only had one track and a platform on the east side of the line. The station was finally closed on 9 October 1927, along with the passenger service, but goods trains to East Kew railway station passed through the site until 1943.

A junction existed  to the south of the station, with the main line going to Riversdale railway station and the loop line towards Canterbury station on the Lilydale railway line. This connection was only open between 15 March 1892 and 12 April 1893. An 18-lever frame was provided at the Lilydale line connection, later reduced to 16 levers. In 1911 a spoil siding was constructed north of Shenley, between the Canterbury and Mont Albert Road road overbridges. Earth fill obtained by widening the cutting at that point was used in the regrading of the Lilydale line.

References
 

Railway stations in Australia opened in 1891
Railway stations closed in 1927
Disused railway stations in Melbourne